is a 1958 color Japanese film directed by Shigehiro Ozawa.

Cast 
 Chiezo Kataoka as Kunisada Chūji
 Ryūnosuke Tsukigata as Genji
 Kōtarō Satomi as Asataro
 Shunji Sakai as Denkichi

See also 
 Kunisada Chūji (国定 忠治) (1810–1851)
 Kunisada Chūji (1954 film)
 The Gambling Samurai 1960 film

References

External links 
 

1958 films
Toei Company films
Films directed by Shigehiro Ozawa
1950s Japanese films